is a 2005 Japanese live-action film based on the 1956 manga Tetsujin 28-go by Mitsuteru Yokoyama. Directed by Shin Togashi, it was the first original film based on the series, as well as the first to be released theatrically.

Plot
Shotaro Kaneda is a young boy living in Tokyo with his widowed mother, Yoko. He is haunted by the death of his scientist father, Dr. Shoichiro Kaneda, and is frequently bullied at school. One day, a giant robot called Black Ox wreaks havoc on the city. Shotaro receives a phone call from his father's former assistant, who informs Shotaro that he is destined to save the world. He guides Shotaro to the location of Tetsujin 28, a giant robot developed by the Japanese during World War II and hidden away by Dr. Kaneda for Shotaro to find. With the help of Chief Otsuka and classmate Mami Tachibana, Shotaro learns to control Tetsujin and does battle with the villainous Dr. Reiji Takumi and Black Ox.

Cast
Sousuke Ikematsu as Shotaro Kaneda
Yu Aoi as Mami Tachibana
Akira Emoto as Chief Yunosuke Otsuka
Teruyuki Kagawa as Dr. Reiji Takumi
Hiroko Yakushimaru as Yoko Kaneda
Hiroshi Abe as Dr. Shoichiro Kaneda
Ayako Kawahara as Layla Neilson Kijima
Katsuo Nakamura as Tatsuzo Ayabe
Masato Ibu as Keitaro Tanoura
Megumi Hayashibara as Black Ox (voice)
Naomi Nishida as Yumiko Yashiro
Rena Tanaka as Asuka Serizawa
Ryūshi Mizukami as Hideyuki Kawai
Sousuke Takaoka as Kenji Murasame
Tomoko Kitagawa as Shizue Kato
Toshifumi Muramatsu as Seijiro Takahashi
Yuko Nakazawa as Kana Ejima
Satoshi Tsumabuki as Windchime Seller
Shin Yazawa as Reporter

Development
Tetsujin 28-go was originally adapted into a live action television drama in 1960, and later as an anime in 1963.

Unlike the original manga and previous adaptations (excluding 1980 anime and Tetsujin 28-go FX), the film is set in modern-day while still based on the original story, with emphasis placed on Shotaro Kaneda's coming-of-age subplot. The mecha were rendered entirely with CGI. Open auditions were held for the roles of Shotaro and Mami. Sousuke Ikematsu and Yu Aoi were each selected from among 10,000 applicants.

Reception
The film garnered lukewarm reviews from critics.

References

External links
 
 

2005 films
Japanese war drama films
Geneon USA
2000s Japanese-language films
Live-action films based on animated series
Japanese World War II films
Films directed by Shin Togashi
Tetsujin 28-go
Live-action films based on manga
2000s Japanese films